Koválovice-Osíčany is a municipality in Prostějov District in the Olomouc Region of the Czech Republic. It has about 300 inhabitants.

Administrative parts
The municipality is made up of villages of Koválovice and Osíčany.

References

Villages in Prostějov District